The Mittelrheinliga, sometimes also referred to as Oberliga Mittelrhein after its elevation to Oberliga status in 2012, is a German amateur football division administered by the Football association of the Middle Rhine, one of the 21 German state football associations. Being the top flight of the Middle Rhine state association, the league is currently a level 5 division of the German football league system.

Overview
Until 1956, a total of ten Landesliga divisions, among them two divisions of Landesliga Mittelrhein were the highest amateur level in the state of North Rhine-Westphalia. After the regular season, the ten Landesliga champions had to play-off for two promotion spots to 2. Oberliga West. Upon decision of the superior Western German football association, in 1956 four divisions of Verbandsliga were introduced, one of them being the Verbandsliga Mittelrhein. These four divisions of Verbandsliga still exist today, with the Verbandsliga Mittelrhein in 2008 renamed to Mittelrheinliga and later in 2012 renamed to Mittelrheinliga.

The Verbandsliga Mittelrhein was upon its inception the third tier of the German football league system. The league champion had to play-off the winners of the Verbandsliga Niederrhein and the two divisions of Verbandsliga Westfalen for two promotion spots to the 2. Oberliga West. Upon introduction of the Bundesliga in 1963, the league was set below the new Regionalliga West but remained as the third tier. With the exception of 1963 and 1974, when the league systems were changed, the champion continued to have the opportunity to win promotion. The clubs from the Verbandsliga Mittelrhein remained mostly unsuccessful as that, only achieving promotion in 1966, 1967, 1968, 1973, 1975, 1976 and 1978.

The league operated with 16 clubs throughout most of its existence, only occasionally altering the numbers to balance out promotion and relegation.

With the replacement of the Regionalliga by the 2nd Bundesliga Nord in 1974, the league champion had to gain promotion through a play-off system with the winners of the other tier-three leagues in northern Germany.

In 1978, the Amateur-Oberliga Nordrhein was formed as the third tier of football in the region compromising the area of the Verbandsliga Mittelrhein and Verbandsliga Niederrhein. One of the main reasons for this move was to provide direct promotion for the tier-three champions again. This season's league winner, Viktoria Köln, was promoted to the 2nd Bundesliga; the clubs placed two to ten in the league were admitted to the new Oberliga, these being:

SV Baesweiler 09
Bonner SC
1. FC Köln II
SC Jülich 1910
TuS Langerwehe
SV Siegburg 04
FC Niederembt
FV Bad Honnef
Borussia Brand

Verbandsliga Mittelrhein, together with Niederrhein, remained as a feeder league for the new Oberliga, but now as a tier-four competition. Its champion, and some years the runners-up, were directly promoted to the Oberliga Nordrhein.

With the re-introduction of the Regionalligas in 1994, the league slipped to tier five but remained unchanged otherwise.

From 2008, with the introduction of the 3rd Liga, the Verbandsliga Mittelrhein was downgraded to the sixth tier. The league above it was then the new NRW-Liga, a merger of the Oberligas Nordrhein and Westfalen. The champion of the Verbandsliga continued to be directly promoted but since there was now four Verbandsligen below the Oberliga, the runners-up did not have the option of promotion unless the league winner declined.

The NRW-Liga existed for only four seasons before it was disbanded again in 2012 in the wake of the Regionalliga West becoming a league for clubs from North Rhine-Westphalia only. While the Oberliga Westfalen was established again in one half of the state the regions of Lower Rhine and Middle Rhine opted to elevate the Niederrheinliga and Mittelrheinliga to Oberliga status instead of reforming the Oberliga Nordrhein.

League champions
The league champions since 1956:

Source:

In 1966, the second placed Bonner SC was promoted instead of SG Düren 99.
In 1967, the second placed Fortuna Köln was promoted because 1. FC Köln II was ineligible.
In 1973, the second placed Viktoria Köln was promoted instead of SV Frechen 20.
In 2008, the second placed Fortuna Köln was promoted because VfL Leverkusen was refused a Regionalliga licence.
The Bonner SC holds the record number of titles, seven, two of them won by its predecessor sides Tura and BFV.
FC Hennef 05 declined promotion in 2012 and 2013 but accepted it in 2014.
In 2021, the season was curtailed because of the COVID-19 pandemic in Germany, with no champion or promotion.

Clubs in the Mittelrheinliga since 2012
The final league placings of all clubs in the league since receiving Oberliga status in 2012:

Key

Founding members of the league

From the 2. Oberliga West:
Rhenania Würselen

From the Landesliga Gruppe 1:
SSV Troisdorf 05
Rapid Köln
VfL Köln 99
SV Habbelrath-Grefrath
SG Eschweiler
SV Stolberg
Tura Hennef

From the Landesliga Gruppe 2:
SSG Bergisch Gladbach
SC Fortuna Köln
FV Godesberg 08
SV Merkstein
Viktoria Alsdorf
BC Kohlscheid
Tura Bonn

References

Sources
 Deutschlands Fußball in Zahlen,  An annual publication with tables and results from the Bundesliga to Verbandsliga/Landesliga. DSFS.
 Kicker Almanach,  The yearbook on German football from Bundesliga to Oberliga, since 1937. Kicker Sports Magazine.
 Die Deutsche Liga-Chronik 1945–2005  History of German football from 1945 to 2005 in tables. DSFS. 2006.

External links 
 League table 
 Verbandsliga Mittelrhein at fussballdaten.de  
 Mittelrhein Football Association (FVM) 

 
Mitt
Football competitions in North Rhine-Westphalia
1956 establishments in Germany